Shair is the oldest Urdu-language literary magazine.

Shair may also refer to:

 5619 Shair, a main-belt asteroid
 Himayat Ali Shair (born 1926), Pakistani poet

See also

 Sha'ir
 Shi'ar